is one of the 18 wards of the city of Yokohama in Kanagawa Prefecture, Japan. As of 2010, the ward had an estimated population of 197,019 and a density of 15,550 persons per km². The total area was 12.67 km².

Geography
Minami Ward is located in eastern Kanagawa Prefecture, and south of the geographic center of the city of Yokohama. Large buildings and apartment complexes are built up along the area surrounding the highways and railways in the Ward; and all other parts of the Ward are residential areas. The Ōoka River is the major river in the Ward, and in spring many cherry blossoms come into full bloom on its banks. Gumyō-ji, located in the southern part of the ward, is the oldest Buddhist temple in Yokohama.

Surrounding municipalities
Hodogaya Ward
Nishi Ward
Isogo Ward
Naka Ward
Totsuka Ward
Konan Ward

History
Part of the domains of the Miura clan during and after the Kamakura period, the area of present-day Minami Ward was part of the tenryō territory in Musashi Province controlled directly by the Tokugawa shogunate, but administered through various hatamoto. During the Bakumatsu period, the area was the site of the 1863 Idogaya Incident in which anti-foreign rōnin assassinated a soldier of the French mission in Yokohama, precipitating a diplomatic incident.

After the Meiji Restoration, the area was transferred to the new Kuraki District of Kanagawa Prefecture, and divided into numerous villages. The area was absorbed into the growing city of Yokohama in four phases: 1895, 1901, 1905 and 1927. On October 1, 1927, what is now Minami Ward became part of Naka Ward within Yokohama. On December 1, 1943, Naka Ward was divided into present-day Naka Ward and Minami Ward. In a major administrative reorganization of October 1, 1969, Minami Ward was further divided into the present-day Minami Ward and Kōnan Ward.

Koganecho, an area known since World War II for black marketing and brothels, was located along the Ōoka River in the ward.  In preparation for Yokohama's 2009 150th anniversary celebrations of opening up as a port, police chased away the prostitutes from the area starting in 2005.  Since then, the area has undergone redevelopment.

Economy
Minami Ward is largely a regional commercial center and bedroom community for central Yokohama and Tokyo due to its extensive commuter train infrastructure.

Transportation

Railroads
Keihin Electric Express Railway - Keikyū Main Line
  –  -  –   
Yokohama City Transportation Bureau – Blue Line
  –  –  –

Highways
Shuto Expressway Kanagawa No. 3 
Yokohama Yokosuka Road
Route 16

Prefecture roads
Kanagawa Prefecture Road 21 
Kanagawa Prefecture Road 218

Education

Kanagawa Prefectural Board of Education operates prefectural high schools:
 
 

 operates municipal high schools:
 
 

Private schools:
 Aoyama Gakuin Yokohama Eiwa High School (formerly Yokohama Eiwa Girls' School)
 

The municipal board of education operates public elementary and junior high schools.

Municipal junior high schools:

 Fujinoki (藤の木)
 Heiraku (平楽)
 Kyoshin (共進)
 Maita (蒔田)
 Minami (南)
 Minamigaoka (南が丘)
 Mutsukawa (六ツ川)
 Nagata (永田)

Municipal elementary schools:

 Bessho (別所)
 Fujinoki (藤の木)
 Hie (日枝)
 Idogaya (井土ケ谷)
 Ishikawa (石川)
 Maita (蒔田)
 Minami (南)
 Minami Ota (南太田)
 Minami Yoshida (南吉田)
 Mutsukawa (六つ川)
 Mutsukawadai (六つ川台)
 Mutsukawa Nishi (六つ川西)
 Nagata (永田)
 Nagatadai (永田台)
 Nakamura (中村)
 Ooka (大岡)
 Ota (太田)

Fujimidai Elementary School (富士見台小学校), Sakuraoka Elementary School (桜岡小学校), Setogaya Elementary School (瀬戸ケ谷小学校), and Takigashira Elementary School (滝頭小学校), which have their campuses outside of Minami-ku, have zones that includes portions of Minami-ku.

Local attractions

 Gumyōji temple
 Yokohama Municipal Children's Botanical Garden
  (in )

Noted people from Minami Ward
Yuki Saito, actress
Erika Umeda, singer
Tadanobu Asano, singer
Yuichi Nakamura, actor
Akira Kamiya, voice actor
Shunji Karube, Olympic runner

References
 Kato, Yuzo. Yokohama Past and Present. Yokohama City University (1990).

External links
Minami Ward Office 
City of Yokohama statistics

Wards of Yokohama